Alexander Yakovlevich Rosenbaum PAR (Aleksandr Jakovlevič Rozenbaum) (born September 13, 1951) is a Russian bard from Saint Petersburg.

Graduated from the First Pavlov State Medical University of St. Peterburg in 1974, Rosenbaum worked in the medical field for four years. His musical education consists of piano and choreography courses at a musical school. In 1968, while still a student, Rosenbaum started writing the songs for which he is famous. His early songs were for student plays, but he soon also wrote for rock groups and started performing as a singer-songwriter in 1983, sometimes under the pseudonym "Ayarov".

Among his most famous songs are the ones about Leningrad, the Soviet–Afghan War, Cossacks, and Odessa. Songs such as "Gop-Stop" (a comedy about two gangsters executing an unfaithful lover) and "Vals-boston" (The Boston Waltz) are popular across Russian social groups and generations.

Rosenbaum is an accomplished guitarist and accompanies himself on either a six- or twelve-string acoustic guitar, using the Open G tuning adopted from the Russian seven string guitar.

His attitude toward the criminal song genre can best be illustrated by his own words:

Titles
On May 16, 2001, by president Putin's decree, Rosenbaum was awarded the title of People's Artist of Russia, probably the highest title in the artistic field of activity in Russia.

Songwriting and performing characteristics
Rosenbaum sometimes employs peculiar musical time signatures and patterns in his songs, striving to sound fresh and unique – a bit atypical for a songwriter that employs gangster and criminal slang elements in his lyrics. Though many of his songs are elaborate in their instrumentation, the stress is placed on the primary melodies of his songs and their messages, as is usually the case in bard music.

However many prominent Russian bards shun Rozenbaum and refuse to count him in as a member of their community. While bards used to be treated as outcasts and their music was drawn underground through the years of Soviet regime, Rozenbaum enjoyed official approval long before collapse of the Soviet Union with its tight ideological censorship. "Bard Song Anthology" by Dmitry Sukharev ("Бардовская песня. Антология", сост. Дмитрий Сухарев) widely acclaimed as 'Bible' of Russian bard movement, listing nearly every author of every song, doesn't even mention his name.

His lyrics are quite often heart-wrenching, telling stories of people in insufferable pain, suffering implacable fates, and of love powerful enough to enslave a man. He sees himself not so much as a critic, but a true patriot who sees the worst sides of his country, but loves its people still.

He has stated that his wide lyrical scope is due to his being a sort of medium. For example, he wrote many crime-related songs using their jargon, but he never lived the criminal life in reality. Similarly, many of his songs about the Cossacks were written without the benefit of ever having a single relative from that community.

Rosenbaum's most popular and culturally relevant song to-date, and his greatest hit, is "Vals-Boston" (Russian: Вàльс-бостòн), which translates to "The Boston Waltz." The title refers to a dance called the American Waltz, or alternatively the Boston.

2000s

Political career
On December 7, 2003, Alexander Rosenbaum took office as a member of the Russian parliament (the fourth Duma) for Yedinaya Rossiya and deputy chairman of the State Duma Culture Committee.  When asked by a journalist about what he had to sacrifice to be able to run for MP, Rosenbaum answered:

He was not listed as an MP in the fifth Duma.

He is also a supporter of Yisrael Beiteinu Israeli political party and sang the theme tune for the party in the 2009 Israeli legislative election.

Rosenbaum expressed support for the annexation of Crimea by Russia in 2014, and stated, "Crimea is ours." For this he was banned from entering Ukraine. Since March 2014, Crimea has been illegally occupied by the Russian Federation.

Business
Rosenbaum is co-owner of a growing (as of 2007) network of beer-halls in Saint-Petersburg, called "Tolstiy Frayer". The name has a humorous, as well as gangster slang air to it and can roughly be rendered as "Fat patsy". The name is a reference to one of Rosenbaum's songs.

Discography
 Pamyati A. Zvezdina-Severnogo (In memory of A. Zvezdin-Severny; April 1982)
  (New Songs; November 1983)
  (Epitaph; 1986)
  (My Courtyards; 1986)
  (Paint Me a House; 1986)
 Doroga dlinoyu v zhizn (The Life-long Road; 1988)
  (Cossacks Songs; 1988)
  (Anathema; 1988)
  (A New-York Concert; 1987)
  (Gop-stop; 1993)
  (Hot Ten; 1994)
 A. Rozenbaum i "Bratya Zhemchuzhniye" 11 let spustya (A. Rosenbaum and the "Zhemchuzhnye Brothers", 11 years after; 1994)
 Veshchaya sudba (Prophetic Fate; 1994, compilation)
  (Nostalgia; 1994)
 Vyalotekushchaya Shizofreniya (Sluggishly progressing schizophrenia; December 1994)
 Byloye i diski (The Past and the Disks; volumes 1, 2 and 3)
 Antologiya 1.  (Anthology 1. A Home Concert; 1981)
 Antologiya 2. Posvyashcheniye posvyashchayushchim (Anthology 2. Devoted to the Devoters; 1983)
 Antologiya 3.  (Anthology 3. A Concert in Vorkuta; 1984)
 Antologiya 4. Kontsert na LOMO (Anthology 4. A Concert at LOMO; 1987)
  (Pink Pearls; August–November 1995)
  (On Plantations of Love; March–May 1996)
  (A Birthday Concert; September 1996)
  (The Return to Argo; February 1997)
  (July Heat; November 1997)
 Luchshiye pesni (The Best Of; 1982–1997, compilation)
 Transsibirskaya magistral (Trans-Siberian Railway 1999)
 Odinokiy volk (Lonesome Wolf; 2001, compilation)
  (Real Soldier; April 2000)
 Staraya gitara (Old Guitar; 2001)
 Ya lyublyu vozvrashchatsya v svoy gorod... (I Love Coming Back to My Town…; 2003)
  (Strange Life; 2003)
 Ya vizhu svet (I See the Light; December 2005)
  (Fellow travellers; October 2007)
  (The Dream of an Underworld Poet November 2009)
  (Unbuttoned Shirt November 2010)
  (Coast of pure brotherhood with Grigory Leps ;December 2011)
  (Metaphysics; December 2015)
 Simbioz (Symbiosis; 2019) (collection of poems performed by the author)
  (Rhythm Love Blues; 2020)

Films about Alexander Rosenbaum 
 1987 — 
 1987 — 
 1990 — 
 1994 — 
 1996 — 
 1997 — 
 1997 — 
 2003 — "The Philosophy of the Way" 20 years later ( and )
 2004 — 
 2010 — 
 2011 — 
 2011 — 
 2016 — 
 2021 — 
 2021 — 
 2021 —

References

External links

 Rozenbaum.ru – Official site, includes many recordings and lyrics.
 Duma.gov.ru – State Duma official site
 
 Apple Music - Alexander Rosenbaum

1951 births
Living people
Musicians from Saint Petersburg
People's Artists of Russia
Russian bards
Russian chanson
Russian Jews
Singers from Saint Petersburg
Soviet songwriters
Soviet male singer-songwriters
Russian male singer-songwriters
20th-century Russian male singers
20th-century Russian singers
Fourth convocation members of the State Duma (Russian Federation)